The 2017 European Skateboarding Championships was held in Malmö, Sweden between May 25-26, 2017 for the park event.

Park skateboarding

Men's

Women's

References

European Skateboarding Championships
2017 European Skateboarding Championships
European Climbing Championships